Geoffrey Angelo Rosario Galatà (born 6 March 1984) is a Dutch former professional footballer who played as a centre back.

Career
Born in Amsterdam to an Italian father and a Dutch mother, Galatà started playing football for local clubs Blauw Wit and AFC. After some years, he joined the Ajax youth academy. His professional career started at Stormvogels Telstar, where he made his debut in the 2003–04 season. In the summer of 2008, his contract with Telstar expired and he left on a free to TOP Oss. There, he initially played on an amateur basis, but on 17 November 2008, Galatà signed a professional contract until mid-2009. Three days later, he scored a bicycle kick against AGOVV Apeldoorn. In 2011, Galatà moved to Sparta Nijkerk and a year later to Quick Boys. From 2013 to 2016 he played for his former side, AFC. He announced his retirement on 11 May 2016 before a match against Koninklijke HFC, after suffering a series of knee injuries.

Honours

Club
FC Oss
Topklasse Sunday: 2010–11

References

External links
 

1984 births
Living people
Footballers from Amsterdam
Association football defenders
Dutch footballers
Dutch people of Italian descent
Blauw-Wit Amsterdam players
Amsterdamsche FC players
AFC Ajax players
SC Telstar players
TOP Oss players
Sparta Nijkerk players
Quick Boys players
Eerste Divisie players
Derde Divisie players